Jan Randall is a Canadian composer, singer songwriter and professional musician. He has had an extensive career composing sound tracks, performing original songs, and improvising music for comedy theatre.

He currently plays regularly with his band Rhythm Train and teaches music history at the University of Victoria, He also releases original classical piano sheet music through his publishing company Vista Heights Music

Singer Songwriter
Jan's first solo concert was at Giuseppi's Pizza in January of 1972 at the age of 19 in Edmonton, Alberta.  Posters of many concerts he gave at folk clubs like the Hovel,  Barricade Coffee House, Room at the Top are available to view online at the Edmonton Public library archive. Across Canada, he performed at the Regina Folk Festivalin 1976 and around Toronto and Montreal after joining Second City Theatre in the early 1980's. In 1981 he joined the funk band Etcetera in Tampa Florida after meeting the guitarist Michael Marth who was playing a Vegas style show in Deerhurst Ontario. On returning to Edmonton the following year, he performed as a sideman for many local bands, including the legendary Amos Garrett. 

Good Fair World (2008) was his first solo recording project which was followed with a world promotional tour that included LA, Memphis, New York, London, Berlin and Rome. His latest release of original songs, Wait in Line is available through Apple Music, SoundCloud and Spotify(2020).

Jan composed and performed over 60 original comedy songs for CBC Radio's The Irrelevant Show  (2012-2017) featuring parodies in the styles of Joni Mitchell, Prince, Cher, Luciano Paverotti, Loreena McKennitt, Johnny Cash, Leonard Cohen, Barry White, Frank Sinatra, and Elvis Presley. Popular songs from this series include an "operetta" about texting, Pavarotti doing his taxes, and Joni Mitchell complaining about Boxing Day sales.

Composer
In 1971 Jan passed an audition to begin music studies at the University of Alberta, graduating in 1975 with a Bachelor of Music, majoring in theory and composition. His professors there included Violet Archer, Malcolm Forsyth, Isobel Ralston, and Alexandra Munn. In 1976 he received a scholarship to attend the Banff School of Fine Arts, followed by jazz studies at Macewan University and North Texas State University.

In January 2014 he performed a classical piano concert of his original solo works at the McDougall United Church that included his "Piano Sonata No. 1" and a collection of Impromptus. In 2016 Jan Randall and Ina Dykstra started Vista Heights Music, a sheet music publishing company featuring their original piano solos. As of 2020, they have nine books out which they distribute nationally through Debra Wanless Music and Long and McQuade. They also sell directly by way of their website, vistaheightsmusic.com

Bands
Currently Jan Randall is fronting the blues band Rhythm Train  in Victoria with the blues legend Jack Lavin Powder Blues Band and drummer Ross Hall.

Jan's first professional band Manna was the coming together of three rival high school bands to play original roots based songs. The act was the first to be managed and recorded by Holger Petersen for Stony Plain Records first album "The Acme Sausage Company."(1970) Several months after graduation Manna joined a North American tour of songs from Jesus Christ Superstar that included performing two of their original songs with symphony orchestra. This included Cobo Hall with the Detroit Symphony for an estimated audience of 12000 people.

Since then he has performed as a sideman with Bo Diddley, Otis Rush, Amos Garrett, Gaye Delorme,  Dave Babcock, Sha Na Na, Spencer Davis, Sam Lay (drummer for Paul Butterfield and Howlin' Wolf) and Gary U.S. Bonds.

Film Scores and Broadcast

In 1985 he built a recording studio, Randall's Recordings, specifically for film and television music production. The studio has garnered over 700 broadcast production credits. In 1998 he won a Rosie award for Best Composer/Musical Score  for the NFB production "Lost Over Burma"  which featured narration by Christopher Plummer.

He composed music for many other documentaries for the NFB, a large body of educational programs for ACCESS, and music to underscore a decade of award-winning productions for Karvonen Films and the Discovery Channel.

In 2006 Jan Randall began work as a radio host on CKUA radio with the Weekend Breakfast show which he produced until 2009.

Music for Stage

Stage works by Jan Randall include  A Midsummer Night's Ice Dream (1992) which was a commission to compose a ballet for the National Ice Theatre of Canada. It won a sterling award for Outstanding Fringe Experience. Tangled Ice Webs followed in 1998, after which came the third ballet Poetry in Motion (2006).

Jan Randall has been  music director for the annual Banff World Television Festival (1995–2007) and performed there with many stars including John Cleese, Bob Newhart, Dame Edna Everage, Martin Short, Steve Allen, and Kelsey Grammer.

He was also the music director and Composer for both the 1996 World Figure Skating Championships, and the 2001 IAAF World Championships in Athletics. The track and field event was broadcast to an estimated four billion viewers in over 200 countries and featured 45000 dancers, the Edmonton Symphony Orchestra, 80 drummers, and the recruiting of a one thousand voice choir.

Music Director/Comedy Improvisor

Jan Randall has been music director, Pianist, Composer and music improvisor for many theatrical comedy troupes.

His work in comedy began in the 1980s in Edmonton, Toronto, and Santa Monica collaborating with The Second City. His first show for them was directed by Catherine O'Hara, and he later worked with Robin Duke, Ron James, Debra McGrath, Richard Kind, Bruce Pirrie, Sandy Belkovske, and Mike Myers. He also appeared on SCTV as a Turkish border guard in the scene "The Midnight Express" where Eugene Levy and Tony Rosato play Abbott and Costello smuggling hashish. While in Santa Monica, he house sat for Ryan Stiles who was recording his first "Whose Line Is It" series in England.

Other comedy troupes Jan collaborated and performed with include Rapid Fire Theatre, and Theatresports. He was the founding music director for Die-Nasty in the early 1990s and appeared with them off and on at the Varscona Theatre and as part of the Edmonton International Fringe Festival for over 20 years. He also performed with them in London, England, in 2009 and played piano continuously for 50 straight hours as part of an improvisation marathon produced by The Sticking Place. He repeated this the following year at Hoxton Hall with the same group.

Music Teacher
In 2014 Jan began to teach music history at the University of Victoria and has offered courses in Blues, Jazz, Boogie Woogie Piano, Joni Mitchell, Leonard Cohen, Billie Holiday, Gordon Lightfoot Buffy Saint-Marie and Ella Fitzgerald.

Personal life
Born in Philadelphia, his first piano teacher was his mother, Laura Randall, who played classical and jazz and taught the neighborhood children. 
She also was a secretary for Hilary Koprowski at the Wistar Institute. He was the first scientist to make a vaccine for polio. Jan's father lost a leg to that disease at the age of 3.

Laura's work editing a textbook for biochemistry led to a job offer in Edmonton, Alberta to work for Dr. John Colter.  The Randall's become Canadian citizens on July 1, 1967.

As a child Jan hated lessons and preferred to play by ear as he had perfect pitch. At the age of 12 he spent half a year learning how to read and write "lead sheets" with a local accordion virtuoso, Vic Lillo.

Jan married television producer Pauline Urquhart in 1989 and the following year daughter Morgan was born.

In 1992 a large collection of audio tapes came into Jan's possession when recording studio Sundown Recorders, went out of business. He donated them to the Provincial Archives of Alberta and included recordings by Hoyt Axton, Bobby Curtola, Gaye Delorme, Gary Fjellgaard, Fosterchild and Hammersmith.

Jan served as treasurer for the Inglewood Community League (1993-1994)treasurer for the Strathcona Housing Coop (2008-2009)on the board for the Screen Composers Guild of Canada (1996-2006) and the American Federation of Musicians (2016–2021).

In 2004 Jan Randall received a letter from a cousin of folk singer Arlo Guthrie that contained information revealing they all shared a great-great-grandfather, Raphael Stukelman.   Later that year he attended a cousins reunion in San Francisco and they all met with Arlo backstage a concert he gave there.

In 2011 Jan Randall married Ina Dykstra, a classical piano teacher and well known music festival adjudicator. They have been living in Victoria BC since 2015.

Discography
 Good Fair World (2008)
 Wait in Line (2020)

Television soundtracks

Lost Over Burma (National Film Board of Canada/ news documentary)
Wilderness Journeys  (Discovery Channel/nature series),
Geek TV (ACCESS/comedy series)
Naked Frailties (drama/feature film)
Purple Gas (comedy/ feature film)

See also
 Music of Canada
 List of Canadian composers

 Arlo Guthrie
 The Second City
 Second City Television

References

External links

Vista Heights Music
History of Second City
NFB Online Film Catalogue

Living people
1952 births
21st-century classical pianists
21st-century Canadian male musicians
Canadian classical pianists
Canadian jazz pianists
Canadian pop pianists
Canadian rock pianists
Classical music radio presenters
Canadian television composers
Male classical pianists